The following is a listing of enterprises, gangs, mafias, and criminal syndicates that are involved in organized crime. Tongs and outlaw motorcycle gangs, as well as terrorist, militant, and paramilitary groups, are mentioned if they are involved in criminal activity for funding. However, since their stated aim and genesis is often ideological rather than commercial, they are distinct from mafia-type groups.

Drug cartels

In several drug-producing or transit countries, drug traffickers have taken advantage of local corruption and lack of law enforcement to establish cartels turning in millions if not billions of dollars each year. Sometimes if government enforcement is particularly poor, the cartels become quasi-paramilitary organizations.

Latin America

 Dominican drug cartels
Paulino organization
Bolivian drug cartels (See also García Meza regime drug trafficking)
La Corporación
Santa Cruz cartel
Guatemalan drug cartels
Kaibiles
Honduran drug cartels
Cachiros
Venezuelan drug cartels (see also Colectivos)
Cartel of the Suns

Colombia

Active 
Bandas criminales (See also Paramilitarism in Colombia)
Clan del Golfo
Oficina de Envigado
National Liberation Army (Colombia)
FARC dissidents

Defunct
 Black Eagles
 Bloque Meta
 Cali Cartel (see also Los Pepes)
 Medellín Cartel (See also Muerte a Secuestradores)
 Norte del Valle Cartel
 North Coast Cartel
 Libertadores del Vichada
 Los Rastrojos

Mexico
 Gulf Cartel
Los Metros
Los Rojos
 Jalisco New Generation Cartel
 Juárez Cartel (possibly defunct)
La Línea (gang)
 Sinaloa Cartel
 Los Ántrax
 Gente Nueva
 Artistas Asesinos (defunct)
 Colima Cartel (defunct)
 Milenio Cartel (defunct)
 Tijuana Cartel
Oaxaca Cartel
 Los Zetas
 Beltrán-Leyva Organization (defunct)
Guerreros Unidos
Los Mazatlecos
La Barredora (defunct)
Independent Cartel of Acapulco (defunct)
 Los Negros (defunct)
Los Pelones (defunct)
 South Pacific Cartel (defunct)
 La Familia Michoacana (defunct)
La Resistencia (gang) (defunct)
 Guadalajara Cartel (defunct)
 Sonora Cartel (defunct)
Knights Templar Cartel (defunct)

Asia

Golden Triangle
Burmese drug cartels (see also Myanmar Nationalities Democratic Alliance Army)
Khun Sa cartel (see also Mong Tai Army)
Red Wa (see also United Wa State Army and National Democratic Alliance Army)
Golden Crescent
 Afghan drug cartels (see also Taliban)
 Noorzai Organization
 Haqqani Network

North American organized crime

Canada
Red Scorpions
Bacon Brothers (gangsters)
Irish Mob
West End Gang
Dubois brothers
Punjabi-Canadian organized crime
 Italian-Canadian Mafia families
 Cosa Nostra
Rizzuto crime family
Cuntrera-Caruana Mafia clan
Cotroni crime family
 'Ndrangheta
Luppino crime family
Musitano crime family
Papalia crime family
Siderno Group
Commisso 'ndrina

United States

National Crime Syndicate
Seven Group
Murder, Inc.
Prohibition-era gangs
Galveston
Downtown Gang
Beach Gang
Sam Maceo's Organisation
Broadway Mob
The Lanzetta Brothers
Shelton Brothers Gang
Sheldon Gang
Circus Cafe Gang
Wandering Family
Polish Mob
Saltis-McErlane Gang
Kielbasa Posse
The Greenpoint Crew
Flats Mob
The Flathead gang
Dixie Mafia
Cornbread Mafia
State Line Mob
Wall gang
Greek-American organized crime
Philadelphia Greek Mob
Velentzas Family
Hispanic-American
Marielitos
The Corporation
Puerto Rican mafia
Agosto organization
La ONU
Solano organization
Negri organization
Márquez gambling ring
Polanco-Rodriguez organization
Assyrian/Chaldean mafia
Hawaii
The Company
Leota mob
Los Angeles (See also Rampart scandal)
Nash gang
Wonderland Gang
Elkins mob
Binion mob

American Mafia
Italian immigrants to the United States in the early 19th century brought with them the underground government many Americans refer to as "Cosa Nostra" (Our Thing) along with its traditions and formal induction rituals along with the concepts and precepts of Omerta, which espouses honorable and manly behavior at all times and under all conditions,taking care your own problems and assisting your community, as well as non-cooperation with corrupt law enforcement and government officials. Many Italian-Americans around this same time also formed various small-time gangs which gradually evolved into sophisticated crime syndicates, but the nationwide organization known as "Cosa Nostra" has traditionally dominated organized crime in America for several decades. Although government crackdowns and a less-tightly knit Italian-American community have largely reduced its power, the American Mafia remains an active force in the underworld

Active
The Commission
The Five Families of New York City
Bonanno
Indelicato crew
The Motion Lounge Crew
Colombo
Scarpa crew
Genovese
116th Street Crew
Greenwich Village Crew
New Jersey Crew
Gambino
Ozone Park Boys
DeMeo crew
Baltimore Crew
South Florida faction
New Jersey faction
The Bergin Crew
Cherry Hill Gambinos
Lucchese
The Jersey Crew
The Vario Crew
107th Street gang
Magaddino crime family
DeCavalcante crime family
The Chicago Outfit (see also Unione Siciliane)
Philadelphia crime family
Pittsburgh crime family
Patriarca crime family
Angiulo Brothers crew
Cleveland crime family
Los Angeles crime family
Kansas City crime family
Cleveland crime family
Trafficante crime family
Detroit Partnership
Milwaukee crime family

Defunct
Morello crime family
Genna crime family
Porrello crime family
St. Louis crime family
Rochester Crime Family
Bufalino crime family
Dallas crime family
Denver crime family
San Francisco crime family
New Orleans crime family
San Jose crime family
Seattle crime family
Omaha crime family
Cardinelli gang
New York Camorra
East Harlem Purple Gang
Las Vegas crew

Jewish mafia
New York City
The Bugs and Meyer Mob
Kaplan gang
New York divorce coercion gang
Rosenzweig gang
Rothstein organization
Schultz gang
Shapiro Brothers
Yiddish Black Hand
Boston
69th Street Gang
Sagansky organization
Solomon organization
Los Angeles
Cohen crime family (mix between Jewish and Italian members)
The Purple Gang
Zwillman gang
Kid Cann's gang
Birger mob
Cleveland Syndicate

African-American organized crime

New York City
The Council
Harlem numbers racket
Bumpy Johnson gang
Supreme Team
The Bebos
The Country Boys
Matthews Organization
The Family
Detroit
Black Mafia Family
Young Boys, Inc.
Chambers Brothers
Philadelphia
Black Mafia
Junior Black Mafia
Oakland, California
69 Mob Funktown and Acorn mobb
Williams organization (drug trafficking)
Washington, D.C.
Rayful Edmond organization 
Theodore Roe's gambling ring
Stokes organization
Atlantic City
Aso Posse
Miami
Miami Boys
Rosemond Organization

Irish Mob
Prohibition-era Chicago gangs
North Side Gang
James Patrick O'Leary organization
John Patrick Looney gang
Valley Gang
Ragen's Colts
Touhy gang
Enright gang
Boston
Mullen Gang
Winter Hill Gang
Gustin Gang
Charlestown Mob
Killeen gang
Danny Hogan's gang
Danny Walsh gang
Tom Dennison empire
Nucky Johnson's Organization
Danny Greene's Celtic Club
K&A Gang
New York
Dwyer gang
White Hand Gang
Higgins gang
The Westies
St Louis
Hogan Gang
Egan's Rats

European organized crime
The Belgian Milieu
'Hormone mafia'
Milieu Liègeois
Czech Republic
Mrázek organization
Krejčíř organization
Dutch 'Penose'
Bruinsma drug gang
Holleeder gang
Mieremet gang
Riphagen gang (WWII-era)
Hopi Boys
French Milieu (See also Service d'Action Civique)
Corsican mafia (see also National Liberation Front of Corsica)
Unione Corse
Carbone crime family
Francisci crime family
Mondoloni crime family
Brise de Mer gang
Les Caïds Des Cités
Faïd gang
The Barbarians
Wigs gang
North African Brigade (see also Carlingue)
Tractions Avant gang
Bande des Trois Canards
Greece
Greek mafia
Ireland (See also Irish Republican Army)
Dublin
Cahill gang
Gilligan gang
Foley gang
Hyland gang
Dunne gang
The Westies
Limerick
McCarthy-Dundon
Keane-Collopy
Rathkeale Rovers
Kinahan gang
Hutch gang
Poland (See also Group 13)
Pruszków mafia
Slovak mafia
Spain (see also ETA)
Garduña
Galician mafia
Romani clans
Casamonica clan
El Clan De La Paca
Raffael clan
Sztojka clan
Rashkov clan
French gypsy gangs
Hornec gang
Organized crime in Sweden
Original Gangsters
Fucked For Life
Uppsala mafia
Chosen Ones
Werewolf Legion
Asir
Vårvädersligan

Italian organized crime

Organized crime in Italy, especially the south, has existed for hundreds of years and has given rise to a number of notorious organizations with their own traditions and subculture which have managed to infiltrate almost every part of Italian society. The Italian mafia is often thought of as being the archetype for organized crime worldwide.

Sicilian Mafia
See also List of Sicilian Mafia clans
Sicilian Mafia Commission
Mandamenti
Cuntrera-Caruana Mafia clan
Inzerillo Mafia clan
Corleonesi
Greco Mafia clan
Motisi Mafia clan
'Ndrangheta
See also List of 'ndrine
La Provincia
Honoured Society (Melbourne)
Mammoliti 'ndrina
Bellocco 'ndrina
Cataldo 'ndrina
Commisso 'ndrina
Cordì 'ndrina
De Stefano 'ndrina
Pesce 'ndrina
Barbaro 'ndrina
Piromalli 'ndrina
Serraino 'ndrina
Siderno Group
Camorra
See also List of Camorra clans
Secondigliano Alliance
Licciardi clan
Contini clan
Lo Russo clan
Mallardo clan
Nuova Camorra Organizzata
Di Lauro Clan
Nuova Famiglia
Casalesi clan
Fabbrocino clan
Giuliano clan
Nuvoletta clan
Vollaro clan
Scissionisti di Secondigliano
La Torre clan
Alfieri clan
Russo clan
Sacra Corona Unita
Società foggiana
Stidda
Mala del Brenta
Basilischi
Rome
Banda della Magliana
Mafia Capitale
Milanese gangs
Banda della Comasina
Turatello crew
White Uno Gang

British organised crime "firms"

London
Adams crime family
The Richardson Gang
The Firm
The Syndicate
Comer gang
Hunt Crime Syndicate
Buttmarsh Boys
Interwar era mobs
Messina Brothers
Sabini syndicate
Hoxton Gang
Elephant and Castle Mob
Birmingham Boys
Essex Boys
Manchester
Quality Street Gang
Noonan firm
Cheetham Hillbillies
The Gooch Close Gang
Liverpool
Curtis Warren's drug empire
Whitney gang
Aggi Crew
Glasgow
McGraw firm
Thompson firm
Delta Crime Syndicate
Brighton razor gangs
Bestwood Cartel

Balkan organized crime
Balkan organized crime gained prominence in the chaos following the communist era, notably the transition to capitalism and the wars in former Yugoslavia.

Albanian mafia (See also accusations of drug trafficking and the Kosovo Liberation Army)
Albania
Gang of Çole
Gang of Gaxhai
Gang of Pusi i Mezinit
Lazarat marijuana growers
Rudaj Organization (New York City)
 Gang of Ismail Lika
Dobroshi gang (International)
Naserligan (Sweden)
K-Falangen (Sweden)
Bosnian mafia
Prazina gang
Turković Organization
Bajramović gang
Delalić gang
Tito & Dino Cartel
M-Falangen (Sweden)
Car Theft Mob
Bulgarian mafia (see also Multigroup)
VIS
SIC
Karamanski gang
TIM
Naglite
Serbian mafia
Arkan clan
Zemun Clan
Joca Amsterdam gang
Magaš clan
Giška gang
Pink Panthers
Serb mafia in Scandinavia
Kotur mob
Yugoslav Brotherhood
Montenegrin mafia (see also allegations of Milo Đukanović's involvement in cigarette smuggling)
Macedonian mafia
Frankfurt mafia
Bajrush klan
Nezim klan'
Romanian mafia
Băhăian organisation
Clanu Camataru
Clanu Cordunenilor
Clanu Rosianu
Craiova Underground Killers Gang
Croatian organized crime (see also Croatian National Resistance, involved in racketeering in the United States during the Cold War)
Croatian Democratic Union

Post-Soviet organized crime

Although organized crime existed in the Soviet era, the gangs really gained in power and international reach during the transition to capitalism. The term Russian Mafia, 'mafiya' or mob is a blanket (and somewhat inaccurate) term for the various organized crime groups that emerged in this period from the 15 former republics of the USSR and unlike their Italian counterparts does not mean members are necessarily of Russian ethnicity or uphold any ancient criminal traditions, although this is the case for some members.

Russian-Jewish mafia
Brighton Beach
Agron gang
Nayfeld gang
Balagula gang
Mogilevich organization
Brothers' Circle (Existence is debatable)
Russian mafia (See also Lubyanka Criminal Group, Three Whales Corruption Scandal and Sergei Magnitsky)Moscow
Izmaylovskaya gang
Solntsevskaya bratvaVarese, Frederico (2005) The Russian mafia: private protection in a new market economy, Oxford University Press, 
New York branch
Orekhovskaya gang
St Petersburg (See also Baltik-Eskort)Tambov Gang
Togliatti mafia
Uralmash gang
Lazovsky gang
Vladivostok gang
Kurganskaya group
Tsapok gang
'Elephants' group
Kazan gang
A.U.E.
Ukrainian mafia (See also Ukrainian oligarchs and Oleksandr Muzychko)Donetsk Clan
Salem gang
Mukacheve cigarette smuggling syndicate
Lithuanian mafia
Vilnius Brigade
Estonian mafia
Linnuvabriku group
Transnistrian mafia

Caucasian crime syndicatesSee also Caucasus EmirateGeorgian mafia (See also Mkhedrioni and Forest Brothers)Kutaisi clan
Tbilisi clan
21st Century Association
Armenian mafia
Mirzoyan-Terdjanian organization
Armenian Power
Azeri mafia
Janiev organization
Chechen mafia (See also Special Purpose Islamic Regiment and Kadyrovtsy)Obschina
Labazanov gang

Central Asian crime syndicates
Uzbek mafia (See also Islamic Movement of Uzbekistan)Rakhimov organization
Kyrgyz mafia
Erkinbayev group
Akmatbayev group
Kolbayev group

Asian organized crime

East Asian criminal organizations

Korean criminal organizations (see also North Korea's illicit activities)Jongro street gang

Japanese YakuzaSee also Kenji Doihara's criminal activities and Aum ShinrikyoThe yakuza of Japan are similar to the Italian mafias in that they originated centuries ago and follow a rigid set of traditions, but have several aspects that make them unique, such as their full-body tattoos and their fairly open place in Japanese society. Many yakuza groups are umbrella organizations, smaller gangs reporting to a larger crime syndicate.

Active yakuza groups
 Roku-daime Yamaguchi-gumi 六代目山口組Kaplan, David E. & Dubro, Alec (2003) Yakuza: Japan's criminal underworld, University of California Press, 
 San-daime Kodo-kai 三代目弘道会
 Go-daime Kokusui-kai 五代目國粹会
 Kobe Yamaguchi-gumi 神戸山口組
 Ni-daime Takumi-gumi 二代目宅見組
 Go-daime Yamaken-gumi 五代目山健組
 Ikeda-gumi 池田組
 Kizuna-kai 絆會
 Inagawa-kai 稲川会
 Yon-daime Yamakawa-ikka 四代目山川一家
 Ju-daime Yokosuka-ikka 十代目横須賀一家
 Juni-daime Koganei-ikka 十二代目小金井一家
 Sumiyoshi-kai 住吉会
 Sumiyoshi-ikka Shichi-daime 住吉一家七代目
 Kobayashi-kai San-daime 小林会三代目
 Kohei-ikka Jusan-daime 幸平一家十三代目
 Kyowa-ikka Shichi-daime 共和一家七代目
 Doshida-ikka Kyu-daime 圡支田一家九代目
 Saikaiya Kyu-daime 西海家九代目
 Musashiya-ikka Ju-daime 武蔵屋一家十代目
 Mabashi-ikka Shichi-daime 馬橋一家七代目
 Shinwa-kai 親和会
 Kansuke-ikka Juni-daime 勘助一家十二代目
 Maruto-kai 丸唐会
 Aota-kai 青田会
 Matsuba-kai 松葉会
 Okubo-ikka Juni-daime 大久保一家十二代目
 Kanto Sekine-gumi 関東関根組
 Kyokuto-kai 極東会
　Matsuyama-rengokai 松山連合会
 Dojin-kai 道仁会
 Kitamura-gumi
 Gon-daime Kudo-kai 五代目工藤會
 Shichi-daime Aizu-Kotetsu-kai 七代目会津小鉄会
Kyokyuryu-kai 旭琉會
Namikawa-kai 浪川会
Roku-daime Kyosei-kai 六代目共政会
Yon-daime Fukuhaku-kai 四代目福博会
Soai-kai 双愛会
San-daime Kyodo-kai 三代目俠道会
Taishu-kai 太州会
Shichi-daime Goda-ikka 七代目合田一家
Ni-daime Azuma-gumi 二代目東組
Go-daime Asano-gumi 五代目浅野組
Ju-daime Sakaume-gumi 十代目酒梅組
Yon-daime Kozakura-ikka 四代目小桜一家
Ni-daime Shinwa-kai 二代目親和会
Tosei-kai 東声会
 San-daime Kumamoto-kai 三代目熊本會
 Kyu-daime Iijima-kai
 Chojiya-kai 丁字家会

Defunct yakuza groups
 Kantō-kai 関東会
 Ni-daime Honda-kai 二代目本多会
 Ni-daime Dainippon Heiwa-kai 二代目大日本平和会
 Yamaguchi-gumi Goto-gumi 後藤組
 Yamaguchi-gumi Suishin-kai 水心会
 Ichiwa-kai 一和会
 Kumamoto-rengo 熊本連合
 Kumamoto rengo San-daime Yamano-kai 三代目山野会
 Nakano-kai 中野会
 Kyokuto Sakurai-soke-rengokai 極東桜井總家連合会

"Hangure"
Hangure (半グレ, literally "half-grey") are considered to be“jun-bōryokudan(準暴力団, quasi-yakuza)” groups. The term half-grey in Japanese refers to groups that commit crimes, yet are not considered to fit the description of criminal organizations (referring to yakuza clans in this context). They mostly consist of Former Bōsōzoku teenagers and Former juvenile delinquents(also known as furyō(不良)) in middle and high schools, who became an adult and refuse to join the Yakuza because of their dislike for traditional code of the Yakuza. Sometimes they outsource their crimes to their kōhai delinquents at Old Bōsōzoku group or Alma Mater as Senpai.

Hangures engage in activities such as loan sharking, drug-trafficking, prostitution, fraud(like a Voice phishing), Robbery, pornography, smuggling, theft, weapons trafficking(mainly Modified Model Guns capable of firing real ammunition or Real Handguns, according to Ex-Hangure who was formerly in the Dragon), and underground fight club.

Kanto Union 関東連合 (semi-defunct)
Dragon 怒羅権 (composed mainly of second and third generation repatriated Japanese orphans and Japanese people of Chinese descent.)
Uchikoshi Spector 打越スペクター (conflict the Kanto Union.)
Kimura Brother's 木村兄弟 (street gang and ex Yamaguchi-gumi member.they against the Kanto Union for a long time.)
Ota Union 大田連合
Tuwamono 強者(defunct)
Kenmun's crew 拳月グループ 
Abyss アビス (youth gang)

Sam Gor, Triads and other Chinese criminal organizations

Sam Gor, also known as The Company, is an international crime syndicate, based in Asia-Pacific. The organization is made up of members of five different triads (14K (triad), Bamboo Union, Wo Shing Wo, Sun Yee On and Big Circle Boys). Sam Gor is understood to be headed by Chinese-Canadian Tse Chi Lop. The Cantonese Chinese syndicate is primarily involved in drug trafficking, earning at least $8 billion per year. Sam Gor is alleged to control 40% or more of the Asia-Pacific methamphetamine market, while also trafficking heroin, ketamine and synthetic drugs, and precursor chemicals. The group is active or working with organized crime partners in a variety of countries, including Cambodia, Laos, Myanmar, Thailand, New Zealand, Australia, Korea, Japan, China, Taiwan and Vietnam." Sam Gor previously produced meth in Southern China and is now believed to manufacture mainly in the Golden Triangle, specifically Shan State, Myanmar, responsible for much of the massive surge of crystal meth in recent years. 
The group is understood to be headed by Tse Chi Lop, a Chinese-Canadian gangster born in Guangzhou, China. Tse is a former member of the Hong Kong-based crime group, the Big Circle Gang and has been compared in prominence to Joaquín "El Chapo" Guzmán and Pablo Escobar. Sam Gor is made up of 14K, Wo Shing Wo, Sun Yee On, Big Circle Gang and Bamboo Union. The group also does business with many other local crime groups such as the Yakuza in Japan and the Comanchero Motorcycle Club and Lebanese mafia in Australia.

The Triads is a popular name for a number of Chinese criminal secret societies, which have existed in various forms over the centuries (see for example Tiandihui). However, not all Chinese gangs fall into line with these traditional groups, as many non-traditional criminal organizations have formed, both in China and the Chinese diaspora.

Hong Kong-based Triads
 14K Group 十四K
 Wo Group 和字頭
 Wo Shing Wo 和勝和
 Wo On Lok (Shui Fong) 和安樂(水房)
 Wo Hop To 和合圖(老和)
 Sun Yee On 新義安(老新)
 Luen Group 聯字頭
 Big Circle Gang 大圈
 Sio Sam Ong (小三王)
 Chinese-American gangs (See also Tongs) Wah Ching 華青
 Ping On
 Black Dragons 黑龍
 Jackson Street Boys 積臣街小子
 Secret societies in Singapore
ai Lok San / Pek Kim Leng
Wah Kee華記
Taiwan-based Triads
United Bamboo Gang 竹聯幫
Four Seas Gang 四海幫
Celestial Alliance
Mainland Chinese crime groups (see also Hanlong Group) Chongqing group 重慶組
 Defunct
Honghuzi gangs
 Green Gang 青帮
 Boshe group
Triads in Cholon
Wu Bang

Southeast Asian criminal organizations

Thailand
Chao pho
Red Wa
Cambodian crime gangs
Teng Bunma organization
Indonesian crime gangs
Preman (See also Pancasila Youth and insurgency in Aceh)Medan gang
Malaysian crime gangs
Mamak Gang
Filipino crime gangs
Waray-Waray gangs
 Bahala Na Gang
Kuratong Baleleng
Sigue Sigue Sputnik gang
Changco gang

Vietnamese Xã Hội Đen
Bình Xuyên
Đại Cathay's mafia during the 60s
Năm Cam's mafia of the 90s
Khánh Trắng's "Đồng Xuân Labor Union", a crime syndicate under the guise of a legal entity
Dung Hà's gang
Mạnh Bệu’s illegal gambling ring
Dũng Mặt Sắt’s illegal car smuggling organization
Minh Sâm’s illegal logging organization

South Asian criminal organizations

Indian mafia (See also Insurgency in Northeast India)Mumbai
D-Company डी कंपनी
Rajan gang राजन गिरोह
Gawli gang गवली गिरोह
Rajan gang
Surve gang
Mudaliar gang
Mastan gang
Budesh gang
Kalani gang
Uttar Pradesh
Ansari gang
Yadav gang
Bangalore
Rai gang
Ramachandra gang
Jayaraj gang
Kala Kaccha Gang
Chaddi Baniyan Gang
Sri Lankan criminal groups (See also Tamil Tigers, Eelam People's Democratic Party and Tamil Makkal Viduthalai Pulikal)Pakistani mafia (See also Peoples' Aman Committee, Tehrik-i-Taliban Pakistan, Muttahida Qaumi Movement and ISI involvement with drugs)Chotu gang
Lyari Gang
Mafia Raj
Dacoit gangs
Singh gang
Veerappan gang
Devi gang

Middle Eastern criminal organizations

Iranian organized crime (see also People's Mujahedin of Iran#Fraud and money laundering, Jundallah and illegal activities of the IRGC)Tahvili crime family
Israeli mafia (see also Stern Gang)Abergil Crime Family משפחת אברג'יל
Alperon crime family משפחת הפשע אלפרון
Zeev Rosenstein organization הארגון של זאב רוזנשטיין
Palestinian organized crime (See also Abu Nidal Organization)Doghmush clan
Lebanese mafia (See also Lebanese Civil War militias)Mhallami-Lebanese crime clans
Miri-Clan
Al-Zein Clan
Juomaa drug trafficking organisation (See also Hezbollah)Ibrahim clan
Turkish mafia
Crime groups in Turkey (see also Deep state and Yüksekova Gang)Kilic gang
Cakici gang
Peker gang
Yaprak gang
Topal organisation
Söylemez Gang
Kurdish mafia (see also Kurdistan Workers' Party)Baybasin drug organization
Cantürk organization
Turkish organised crime in Great Britain
Arifs
Turkish organised crime in Germany
Arabaci clan
Imac clan (Netherlands)

Australian organized crime

Melbourne
Carlton Crew
Moran family
Williams family
Pettingill family
Richmond gang
Perth
Sword Boys
Sydney
Razor gangs
5T gang
Freeman gang
The Team
Mr Sin gang
Italian-Australian organized crime
The Carlton Crew
'''Ndrangheta
Honoured Society

Caribbean crime groups

Chadee gang (Trinidad & Tobago) (see also Jamaat al Muslimeen)
Jamaican Yardies & Posses
Shower Posse
POW Posse
Tottenham Mandem
Star Gang
Klans Massive
No Limit Soldiers
 Organizacion de Narcotraficantes Unidos
Phantom death squad (Guyana)
Zoe Pound (Haitian, see also Tonton Macoute)

African organized crime

Mai-Mai militia gangs
The Numbers Gang
Kenya
Akasha crime family
Mungiki
Cape Verdean organized crime
Somali pirates
Hobyo-Harardhere Piracy Network
Nigerian organized crime
Confraternities in Nigeria
Black Axe Confraternity
Anini gang
Le Roux organization
Moroccan mafia
Ahmed organization
Mocro Maffia
Taghi clan
Fassih clan

Cybercrime networks

As society enters the Information Age, certain individuals take advantage of easy flow of information over the Internet to commit online fraud or similar activities. Often the hackers will form a network to better facilitate their activities. On occasion the hackers will be a part of a criminal gang involved in more 'blue collar crime', but this is unusual.

ShadowCrew
Avalanche
DarkMarket
Legion of Doom
Carder.su
Tor Carding Forum
HackBB
Masters of Deception
Russian cybercrime
Russian Business Network
Anton Gelonkin internet fraud group
Leo Kuvayev internet spam group
CyberVor
Darknet markets
AlphaBay
Utopia
The Silk Road
Sheep Marketplace
TheRealDeal
Black Market Reloaded
The Farmer's Market
Evolution
Agora
AlphaBay Market
Russian Anonymous Marketplace

Drug and smuggling rings
Smuggling is a behavior that has occurred ever since there were laws or a moral code that forbade access to a specific person or object. At the core of any smuggling organization is the economic relationship between supply and demand. From the organization's point of view, the issues are what the consumer wants, and how much the consumer is willing to pay the smuggler or smuggling organization to obtain it.

England
Hawkhurst Gang (historical)
The Aldington Gang(historical)
Organ trafficking organizations
Gurgaon organ trafficking network
Arms trafficking organizations
Russian arms traffickers
Viktor Bout's organization
Leonid Minin's organization
Monzer al-Kassar's organization
Tomislav Damnjanovic organization
Soghanalian organization
People smuggling
Snakeheads 蛇頭
Sister Ping's organization
Coyotaje
Shettie organization
Mediterranean people smugglers
Lai Changxing organization
Bedouin smugglers
Subotić Tobacco mafia (alleged)

Drug rings

North American drug rings
Garza organization
Jesse James Hollywood's drug ring
The Brotherhood of Eternal Love
Black Tuna Gang
The Company
Jung organization
Mancuso organization
Chagra organization
"Freeway" Rick Ross
Ike Atkinson
Cournoyer organization
Cowboy Mafia
Pizza Connection
The Yogurt Connection
Bali Nine
Mr Asia syndicate
The French Connection
The Couscous connection
Valencia drug ring
Brian Brendan Wright's drug empire
Howard Marks
Rum-running organization
William McCoy 
Roy Olmstead 
Remus organization
Yashukichi network
Edward Ezra's opium smuggling operation
Tyrrell organisation
Guinea-Bissau cocaine traffickers
Na Tchuto organization

Prison gangs
Prisons are a natural meeting place for criminals, and for the purposes of protection from other inmates and business prisoners join gangs. These gangs often develop a large influence outside the prison walls through their networks. Most prison gangs do more than offer simple protection for their members. Most often, prison gangs are responsible for any drug, tobacco or alcohol handling inside correctional facilities. Furthermore, many prison gangs involve themselves in prostitution, assaults, kidnappings and murders. Prison gangs often seek to intimidate the other inmates, pressuring them to relinquish their food and other resources. In addition, prison gangs often exercise a large degree of influence over organized crime in the "free world", larger than their isolation in prison might lead one to expect.

Primeiro Comando da Capital (First Command of the Capital) (São Paulo, Brazil)
Vory v zakone (вор в законе) (Prisons in Russia and other post-Soviet countries)
The Numbers Gang (Prisons in South Africa) See also The Ninevites
Brödraskapet (The Brotherhood) (Kumla Prison, Sweden)
The Overcoat Gang (Prisons in Australia)
Philippines
New Bilibid Prison
Commandos
Wild Boys of DaPeCol (Davao)

Prison gangs in the United States
White
Aryan Brotherhood
Dead Man Incorporated
Public Enemy No. 1
Nazi Lowriders
Soldiers of Aryan Culture
European Kindred
Aryan Circle
211 Crew
Peckerwoods
Aryan Brotherhood of Texas
Hispanic
Barrio Azteca
Mexican Mafia (La Eme)
Nuestra Familia
Texas Syndicate (Syndicato Tejano)
Ñetas
Puro Tango Blast
Mexikanemi
Hermanos de Pistoleros Latinos
African American
Black Guerrilla Family
D.C. Blacks
United Blood Nation
KUMI 415
People Nation
Folk Nation

Street gangs
Youth gangs have often served as a recruiting ground for more organized crime syndicates, where juvenile delinquents grow up to be full-fledged mobsters, as well as providing muscle and other low-key work. Increasingly, especially in the United States and other western countries, street gangs are becoming much more organized in their own right with a hierarchical structure and are fulfilling the role previously taken by traditional organized crime.

North America
Friends Stand United
Freight Train Riders of America (alleged)
Juggalo gangs
Albanian Boys Inc
Chicago
TAP Boyz
Simon City Royals
Chicago Gaylords
Jousters
Almighty Saints
Popes
Italian-American street gangs
10th and Oregon Crew
South Brooklyn Boys
Forty-Two Gang
The Tanglewood Boys
Green Street Counts
Zoe Pound
Pacific-Islander American gangs
Sons of Samoa
Tongan Crip Gang
Native Mob
Savage Skulls (defunct)

African-American
Chicago
Gangster Disciples
Mickey Cobras
Black Disciples
Vice Lords
Black P. Stones
Four Corner Hustlers
OutLaw Gangster Disciples
Black P. Stones (Jungles)
Bloods
Sex Money Murda
Double II Set
Pirus
Nine Trey Gangsters
Crips
Venice Shoreline Crips
Rollin 60's Neighborhood Crips
Eight Tray Gangsta Crips
East Nashville Crips
Du Roc Crips
Rollin' 30s Harlem Crips
Grape Street Watts Crips
South Side Compton Crips
12th Street Gang
Errol Flynns
Westmob
Hidden Valley Kings
New York City
Decepticons (defunct)
Black Spades (defunct)
GS9
Boston
Lucerne Street Doggz
Columbia Point Dawgs
Orchard Park Trailblazers
Minneapolis–Saint Paul
Somali Outlaws

Native American/Indigenous

Minneapolis–Saint Paul
Native Mob

Asian-American
New York City Chinatown
 Ghost Shadows 鬼影幫
 Flying Dragons
 Born To Kill 天生殺手幫
 Asian Boyz 亞洲 (Crip set)
 Chung Ching Yee (Joe Boys) 忠精義
 Fullerton Boys
 Menace of Destruction 毀滅的威脅
 Temple Street (Filipino-Mexican)
 Tiny Rascal gang
 Satanas
 Viet Boyz

Hispanic
Latin Kings
Ghetto Brothers
New York City Dominican gangs
Dominicans Don't Play
Jheri Curls
Trinitarios
California
White Fence
Whittier gang
Fresno Bulldogs
Lott Stoner Gang
Norteños
Sureños
38th Street gang
Culver City Boys 13
Santa Monica 13
Azusa 13
Puente 13
OVS
Eastside Bolen Parque 13
Northside Bolen Parque 13
El Monte Flores 13
Venice 13
Tooner Ville Rifa 13
Clanton 14
Varrio Nuevo Estrada
Playboys
Avenues
Logan Heights Gang
Pomona 12th Street Sharkies
Chicago
La Raza Nation
Latin Counts
Maniac Latin Disciples
Spanish Cobras
Spanish Gangster Disciples
Los Mexicles

Historical
Irish American
Bottoms Gang
19th Street Gang
Bowe Brothers
40 Thieves
Dead Rabbits
Gopher Gang
Grady Gang
Five Points Gang
Daybreak Boys
Tenth Avenue Gang
Kerryonians
Roach Guards
Whyos
Chichesters
Marginals
Live Oak Boys
Potashes
Bottoms Gang
New York
Neighbors' Sons
Boodle Gang
Loomis Gang
Baxter Street Dudes
Honeymoon Gang
Mandelbaum organization
Dutch Mob
Eastman Gang
Batavia Street Gang
Bowery Boys
Charlton Street Gang
Gas House Gang
Lenox Avenue Gang
Crazy Butch Gang
Hudson Dusters
Humpty Jackson Gang
Slaughter House Gang
Cherry Hill Gang
Swamp Angels
Yakey Yakes
Hook Gang
Tub of Blood Bunch
Baltimore
Bloody Tubs
Plug Uglies
Sydney Ducks
Chicago
Formby Gang
Henry Street Gang
Yellow Henry Gang

Gangs in Canada
Vancouver
Independent Soldiers
United Nations
Red Scorpions
Aboriginal Based Organized Crime
Indian Posse
Native Syndicate
Redd Alert
Manitoba Warriors - 1323
Toronto
VVT
Dixon Bloods
Tri-City Skins
Shiners (historical)

Other
El Salvador
Maras
Mara Salvatrucha
18th Street gang
Gangs in Haiti
Zoe Pound
Cannibal Army
Belize
George Street Crew

South America
Gangs in Brazil
Rio de Janeiro
Amigos dos Amigos
Comando Vermelho
Terceiro Comando
Terceiro Comando Puro
São Paulo
PCC - Primeiro Comando da Capital
Brazilian police militias
Acre death squad
Argentina
Los BackStreet Boys

Europe
Gangs in the United Kingdom
London
67
Brick Lane Massive
GAS Gang
Ghetto Boys
Harlem Spartans
Mali Boys
Mus Love Crew
OFB
Peckham Boys
PDC
Tottenham Mandem
Wo Shing Wo street gang (defunct)
Woolwich Boys
Zone 2
Gooch gang
Birmingham
Lynx gang
Burger Bar Boys & Johnson Crew
Croxteth Crew & Strand Crew
Denmark
AK81
Black Cobra
Loyal to Familia
Belgium
Kamikaze Riders
Turkish-German gangs
36 Boys
Black Jackets
Osmanen Germania
Guerilla Nation
Sweden
Al Salam 313
Original Gangsters
Apaches (Belle Époque period)
Red Wall Gang (Dublin)

Africa
Gangs in South Africa
Cape Ganglands
Hard Livings
The Americans
Gangs in Nigeria
Area Boys
One Million Boys
Morocco
Tcharmils

Asia
Salakau (Singapore)
Filipino gangs
Bahala Na Gang
Rugby boys
Waray-Waray gangs
Aava Gang (Sri Lanka)

Oceania
Gangs in Australia
Sydney
Rocks Push
Brothers for Life
Dlasthr
Melbourne
Apex
Islander 23
HP Boyz
Next Gen Shooters
Perth
Sword Boys
Evil Warriors
Gangs in New Zealand
Mongrel Mob
Black Power
New Zealand Nomads
King Cobras
Killa Beez
Fourth Reich
Raskol gangs

Outlaw motorcycle clubs

Bandidos Motorcycle Club
Black Pistons Motorcycle Club
Blue Angels Motorcycle Club
Coffin Cheaters
Finks Motorcycle Club
Hells Angels Motorcycle Club
Highway 61 Motorcycle Club
Highwaymen Motorcycle Club
Mongols Motorcycle Club
Night Wolves
Outlaws Motorcycle Club
Pagan's Motorcycle Club
Rebels Motorcycle Club
Rebels Motorcycle Club (Canada)
Road Knights
Satudarah
Sons of Silence
Vagos Motorcycle Club
Warlocks Motorcycle Club

Other
Timber mafia
Malagasy logging syndicates
'Rosewood mafia'
Football hooliganism groups
La barra del Rojo
6.57 Crew
Arsenal firm
Aston Villa Hardcore
Prostitution rings
Emperors Club VIP
Heidi Fleiss prostitution ring
North Preston's Finest
Vivian's Friends
Pamela Martin and Associates
Spy rings
Atomic spies
Cambridge Five
Duquesne Spy Ring
Illegals program
Portland Spy Ring
Walker spy ring
Burglary rings
Dinner Set Gang
Bling Ring
Johnston gang
Sugarman Gang
Fraud rings (See also List of Ponzi schemes)
Potato Bag gang
Nigerian 419 gangs
Chief Nwude and accomplices
Benson Syndicate
Dominion of Melchizedek
Illegal gambling rings
Brazilian Jogo do Bicho rings
Anísio group
Capitão Guimarães group
Andrade group
Luizinho Drummond group
Turcão group
Pinheiro group
Tan betting syndicate
Bad Newz Kennels dogfighting ring
Human trafficking rings
Domotor family crime group
la Chancha gang
Wildlife trafficking rings
Wong organization
Kidnapping
Black Death Group (alleged)
The College Kidnappers
Criminals-for-hire
Philadelphia Poison Ring (murder-for-hire)
Sangerman's Bombers (arson)
The Chickens and the Bulls

Historical
Black Hand
Chicago Black Hand
Thuggee (See also Criminal Tribes Act)
Garduna
Markham Gang
England
Early crime syndicates
Jonathan Wild's crime ring
Charles Hitchen's crime ring
Forty Elephants
Ikey Solomon gang
Worth gang
Street gangs
The Yiddishers
Peaky Blinders
Scuttlers
Glasgow
Penny Mobs
Tongs
Razor gangs
Norman Conks
Predecessors to modern yakuza (See also Genyōsha)
Tekiya 的屋
Bakuto 博徒
Kabukimono 傾奇者 (カブキもの)
American Frontier gangs (See also List of Old West gangs)
Ames organization
Soap Gang criminal empire, Denver, Creede, Colorado, and Skagway, Alaska 1880s-1890s.
Swearengen gang
Banditti of the Prairie
Dodge City Gang
Dennison syndicate
The Cowboys (Cochise County)
Blonger gang
Ringvereine (Weimar Germany)
Historic prostitution rings
Zwi Migdal
Ashkenazum
Red Light Lizzie and associates
Jane the Grabber and associates
Historical Russian gangs (See also Early life of Joseph Stalin)
Mishka Yaponchik gang
Kotovsky gang
Stuppagghiari

See also

Continuing Criminal Enterprise Statute
Crime family
Gang
Illegal drug trade
Secret combination (Latter Day Saints)
List of guerrilla movements
List of bank robbers and robberies
List of computer criminals
List of confidence tricks
List of crime bosses
List of depression-era outlaws
List of designated terrorist groups
List of hooligan firms
List of law enforcement agencies
List of Mexico's 37 most-wanted drug lords
List of most wanted fugitives in Italy
List of post-Soviet mobsters
List of non-state groups accused of terrorism
List of outlaw motorcycle clubs
Mafia
Mafia state
Organized crime
Police corruption
Political corruption
Racket
Racketeer Influenced and Corrupt Organizations Act
War on Drugs

References

Organized crime
Organized crime-related lists
Lists of organizations
Lists of gangs
Gangs